Bruckberg is a municipality in the district of Landshut in Bavaria in Germany. Until 30 April 1978 it belonged to the upper bavarian district of Freising.

References

Landshut (district)